Close Together (As You and Me) is an album of duets and solo selections by George Jones and Melba Montgomery.  It was released on the Musicor label in 1966.

Track listing
"Close Together (As You and Me)"
"From Here To The Door" (Don Chapel)
"Living On Easy Street" (Earl Montgomery)
"As of Now"
"Feudin' and Fightin'" (Dubin/Lane)
"Long As We're Dreaming" 
"Developing My Pictures" (E. Montgomery)
"Let's Both Have A Cry"
"Heartaches for a Day"
"Simply Divine" (Melba Montgomery)

1966 albums
George Jones albums
Melba Montgomery albums
Musicor Records albums